Heinrich Meyring/ Heinrich Meiering  (1628 – 11 February 1723) was a German sculptor, active mainly in Venice and the Veneto. He is also known as Enrico Merengo or Arrigo Merengo.

Meyring was born in Rheine, Westphalia.  He is considered one of the main pupils of the Flemish sculptor (active in Venice) Josse de Corte (or Giusto Le Court). Meyring appears to be active in Venice from 1679 to 1714.
 
The statues of Annunciation in Santa Maria del Giglio are by Meyring.

Further reading
 Reinhard Karrenbrock, Zwei Generationen westfälischer Bildhauer: Heinrich Meiering - Bernd Meiering. Stiftung Museumsdorf Cloppenburg 1992.

Sources
 Dissertation by Silvia Wolff

1628 births
1723 deaths
17th-century German sculptors
German male sculptors
German Baroque sculptors
18th-century German sculptors
18th-century German male artists
Italian sculptors
Italian male sculptors